Dunton is the name of more than one place.

In the United Kingdom:

Dunton, Bedfordshire
Dunton, Buckinghamshire
Dunton, Norfolk
Dunton Bassett, Leicestershire
Dunton Green, Kent
Dunton, Essex
Dunton Wayletts, Essex
Dunton Technical Centre, Essex

See also

Danton (name)